Cello is an early, discontinued graphical web browser for Windows 3.1; it was developed by Thomas R. Bruce of the Legal Information Institute at Cornell Law School. It was released as shareware in 1993. While other browsers ran on various Unix machines, Cello was the first web browser for Microsoft Windows, using the winsock system to access the Internet. In addition to the basic Windows, Cello worked on Windows NT 3.5 and with small modifications on OS/2.

Cello was created because of a demand for Web access by lawyers, who were more likely to use Microsoft Windows than the Unix operating systems supporting earlier Web browsers, including the first release of Mosaic. The lack of a Windows browser meant many legal experts were unable to access legal information made available in hypertext on the World Wide Web. Cello was popular during 1993/1994, but fell out of favor following the release of Mosaic for Windows and Netscape, after which Cello development was abandoned.

Cello was first publicly released on 8 June 1993. A version 2.0 was announced, but development was abandoned. Version 1.01a, 16 April 1994, was the last public release. Since then, the Legal Information Institute at Cornell Law School has licensed the Cello 2.0 source code, which has been used to develop commercial software.

The browser is no longer available from its original homepage. However, it can still be downloaded from mirror sites.

Development and history

The development of Cello started in 1992, with beta versions planned for June 1993 and a release for July 1993. It was publicly announced on 12 April 1993.

The Legal Information Institute at Cornell Law School created the first law site on the
Internet in 1992 and the first legal website in 1993. However, at the time, there were no web browsers for the Microsoft Windows operating system, which was used by most lawyers. Thus, to allow lawyers to use their website, the Legal Information Institute developed the first Windows-based Web browser. This was made possible by a grant from the National Center for Automated Information Research.

Although other browsers at the time were based on CERN's WWW libraries called libwww, PCs of the time were not powerful enough to run the UNIX-oriented code. As a result, Thomas Bruce had to rewrite most of the WWW libraries to work on Microsoft Windows. Unlike most commercial browsers at that time, Cello used none of Mosaic's source code and thus had a different look and feel.

Steven Sinofsky, president of the Windows division at Microsoft wrote in a June 1994 email: We do not currently plan on any other client software [in the upcoming release of Windows 95], especially something like Mosaic or Cello. Nevertheless, on 11 January 1995, Microsoft announced that it had licensed the Mosaic technology from Spyglass, which it would use to create Internet Explorer. On 15 August 1995, Microsoft debuted its own web browser Internet Explorer 1 for Windows 95. While it did not ship with the original release of Windows 95, it shipped with Microsoft Plus! for Windows 95.

Usage
When released in 1993, Cello was the only browser for the Microsoft Windows platform. Shortly after launch, Cello was being downloaded at a rate of 500 copies per day. As such, it achieved a fair amount of use and recognition within the legal community, including a number of PC users with between 150,000 and 200,000 users. In 1994, most websites were visited using either the Cello browser or the Mosaic browser. Despite having fewer features than Mosaic, Cello continued to be used due to its simpler interface and lower system requirements. Cello was praised for being easy to install, because it wasn't necessary to install Win32s or a TCP/IP stack for Windows 3.1. Following the release of Windows 95, which offered a much better TCP/IP interface, Cello fell into disuse and was abandoned.

By 1995, Cello, like the Mosaic browser, was overshadowed by two newer browsers — Netscape and Internet Explorer — and fell into disuse. By 1999, Cello was considered to be a "historical" browser.

Cello is considered to be one of the early casualties of the Browser wars.

Features
Cello had the following features:
 

Unlike Mosaic, Cello did not have toolbar buttons, and instead commands were accessed through pull-down menus.

Supported Protocols
Cello supported the following protocols: HTTP 1.0, Gopher (but not Gopher+), read-only FTP, SMTP mailing, Telnet, Usenet, CSO/ph/qi directly and WAIS, HyTelnet, TechInfo, Archie, X.500, TN3270 and a number of others through public gateways.

Supported FTP servers
Cello supported the following FTP servers: most Unix servers (including SunOS, System V, and Linux), IBM VM, VMS systems, Windows NT, QVTNet, NCSA/CUTCP/Rutgers PC servers, FTP Software PC server, HellSoft NLM for Novell.

Internet Connection
Cello works best with a direct Ethernet connection, but it also supports SLIP and PPP dialup connections through the use of asynchronous sockets. Cello has an integrated TCP/IP runtime stack.

Release history

The following versions were released:

Although Cello 2.0 had been announced, development ceased before a public release.

IBM released a fix for their TCP/IP V2.0 stack so that Cello would work with OS/2 WinOS/2 on 9 February 1994.

Browser comparison table
The following table shows how Cello compared to browsers of its time.

Derivatives
 The first edition of BURKS, a project to produce non-profit CD-ROMs of resources for students of Computer Science, was based on Cello.
 InterAp, by California Software Inc, was based on Cello and featured a web browser with Telnet, FTP, and a Visual Basic-compatible scripting language called NetScripts.
 A version of Lovelace came bundled with Cello.

Technical
While originally Cello required the Distinct Corporation's TCP/IP stack, with the release of Cello Beta Version .8, Cello dropped support for Distinct, and became exclusively Winsock-based.

Originally, although Cello could run on OS/2, OS/2's implementation of Winsock had bugs that prevented Cello from accessing the Internet. The bug, APAR #PN52335, was later fixed allowing Cello to properly work on OS/2.

The user agent for Cello is LII-Cello/<version>  libwww/2.5.

DDE support
Cello featured Dynamic Data Exchange (DDE) support. OLE support and DDE client support were planned, but never released.

An example of how to invoke Cello from a Microsoft Word macro:
Sub MAIN
ChanNum = DDEInitiate("Cello", "URL")
DDEExecute(ChanNum, "http://www.law.cornell.edu")
DDETerminate(ChanNum)
End Sub

System requirements
Cello has the following system requirements:

 Processor: 80386(386SX) at 16 MHz or better
 Operating System: Windows 3.1 / 3.11 / Windows NT 3.5 / OS/2.
 Ram: 2 MB RAM, 4 MB RAM recommended
 A TCP/IP connection running Winsock

Criticism
Cello was not very stable and its development halted early.

Cello did not render graphics well and required that the user reload the webpage when resizing the window. Like most browsers at the time, Cello also did not support any web security protocols. It was also said that Cello rendered html "crudely" and pages would appear jaggedly.

Cello also had sub-par performance in accessing the Internet and processing hypermedia documents.

See also
 Mosaic
 MacWeb
 Libwww

Notes

References

Bibliography

Further reading

External links
 
 Cello: a well strung instrument
 Cello index at W3C

Windows web browsers
Gopher clients
Cornell University
1993 software
1994 software
Discontinued web browsers
OS/2 web browsers